Quello Cocha (possibly from in the Quechua spelling Q'illuqucha or Q'illu Qucha; q'illu yellow, qucha lake, "yellow lake") is a mountain in the Andes of Peru, about  high. It is located in the Arequipa Region, Condesuyos Province, Cayarani District. Quello Cocha lies east of a lake named Tintarcocha (Tintarqucha).

References 

Mountains of Peru
Mountains of Arequipa Region